Basireddypally is a village and panchayat in Nalgonda  district, Telangana, India. It falls under peddavoora mandal.

References

Villages in Ranga Reddy district